Scott Francis May (born November 11, 1961) is a former Major League Baseball pitcher. May was originally drafted in the sixth round of the 1983 Major League Baseball Draft by the Los Angeles Dodgers. In 1987, he was traded to the Texas Rangers for Javier Ortiz. He played at the Major League level with the Rangers in 1988. The following year, he was traded along with minor league player Mike Wilson to the Milwaukee Brewers for La Vel Freeman and minor league player Todd Simmons. Later in his career, he signed with the Chicago Cubs and played at the Major League level with the team in 1991.

May attended high school in Almond, Wisconsin and played at the collegiate level at the University of Wisconsin-Stevens Point.

References

External links

Pura Pelota (Venezuelan Winter League)

1961 births
Living people
Alacranes de Campeche players
Albuquerque Dukes players
Bakersfield Dodgers players
Baseball players from Wisconsin
Chicago Cubs players
Denver Zephyrs players
El Paso Diablos players
Iowa Cubs players
Lethbridge Dodgers players
Major League Baseball pitchers
Oklahoma City 89ers players
People from Portage County, Wisconsin
People from West Bend, Wisconsin
Petroleros de Cabimas players
Rockford Cubbies players
San Antonio Dodgers players
Sportspeople from the Milwaukee metropolitan area
Texas Rangers players
Tiburones de La Guaira players
American expatriate baseball players in Venezuela
University of Wisconsin–Stevens Point alumni
Wisconsin–Stevens Point Pointers baseball players
American expatriate baseball players in Taiwan
Wei Chuan Dragons players